Indefinite detention is the incarceration of an arrested person by a national government or law enforcement agency for an indefinite amount of time without a trial; the practice violates many national and international laws, including human rights laws. In recent years, governments have indefinitely incarcerated individuals suspected of terrorism, often in black sites, sometimes declaring them enemy combatants.

Views
Most nations of the world and human rights groups hold unfavorable views towards indefinite detention.

Australia

In 1994, indefinite detention was introduced for Vietnamese, Chinese, and Cambodian refugees; previous laws had imposed a 273-day limit. In 2004, the High Court of Australia ruled in the case Al-Kateb v Godwin that the indefinite detention of a stateless person is lawful.

China

Human rights group claim a history of forced labour, arbitrary arrest and detention of minority groups, including: Falun Gong members, Tibetans, Muslim minorities, political prisoners and other groups in the People's Republic of China. Notably, since at least 2017, more than one million Uyghur and other minorities have been overwhelmingly detained without trial for the purposes of a "people's war on terror". In the case of the Falun Gong in particular, there have been claims of extraordinary abuses of human rights in concentration camps, including organ harvesting and systematic torture.

Israel
It was reported in July 2016 by Haaretz that 651 Palestinians were in Israeli jails without having been given due process, and that the number of Palestinians being detained in Israel without trial was on the rise. In October 2021, it was reported that Israel's Police Commissioner Kobi Shabtai was personally pushing for the use of detentions without trial or "administrative detentions" by the Shin Bet security service to police Israel’s Arab communities.

Malaysia
The Internal Security Act, enacted in 1960, allowed indefinite detention without trial for two years, with further extensions as needed. It was repealed in 2012 amid public pressure for political reform. The Prevention of Terrorism Act (POTA) was introduced in March 2015 after a series of terrorist acts was committed in Malaysia. POTA allows authorities to detain terrorism suspects without trial but stipulates that no person was to be arrested for their political beliefs or activities.

Singapore
In Singapore, the Internal Security Act allows the government to arrest and indefinitely detain individuals who pose a threat to national security.

Switzerland
In Switzerland, local laws related to 'dangerousness' can be invoked to incarcerate persons without charge. This was controversially effected in the case of Egyptian refugee Mohamed El Ghanem.

Thailand
Arnon Nampa was detained without trial in 2020 for 6 days but after Prime Minister Prayuth Chan-o-cha declared to use all laws including lese majeste to the protesters in November 2020, he had been detained for 110 days in first round of remanding. After he received bail just 3 months, he has been imprisoned again without trial until today.

United Kingdom
In 2004, the House of Lords ruled that indefinite detention of foreign terrorism suspects under Section 23 of the Anti-terrorism, Crime and Security Act 2001 violated the Human Rights Act and the European Convention on Human Rights.  Under Schedule 8 of the Terrorism Act 2000, the detention of terrorism suspect may be prolonged upon application of a warrant for further detention by a Crown prosecutor (in England and Wales), the Director of Public Prosecutions (in Northern Ireland), the Lord Advocate or procurator fiscal (in Scotland), or a police superintendent (in any part of the United Kingdom).

United States

In the United States, indefinite detention has been used to hold terror suspects during the War on Terror. According to the American Civil Liberties Union (ACLU), Section 412 of the Patriot Act permits indefinite detention of immigrants; one of the most highly publicized cases has been that of Jose Padilla, whose ultimate prosecution and conviction in the United States have been highly controversial. The indefinite detention of prisoners at Guantanamo Bay has been called a violation of international law by the United Nations, the International Committee of the Red Cross, and Human Rights Watch.

On November 29, 2011, the United States Senate rejected a proposed amendment to the National Defense Authorization Act for Fiscal Year 2012 ("NDAA") that would have banned indefinite detention by the United States government of its own citizens, leading to criticism that the right of habeas corpus had been undermined. The House of Representatives and Senate approved the National Defense Authorization Act in December 2011, and President Barack Obama signed it December 31, 2011. The new indefinite detention provision of the law was decried as a "historic assault on American liberty." The ACLU stated that "President Obama's action today is a blight on his legacy because he will forever be known as the president who signed indefinite detention without charge or trial into law."

On May 16, 2012, in response to a lawsuit filed by journalist Chris Hedges, Noam Chomsky, Naomi Wolf and others, United States District Judge Katherine B. Forrest ruled that the indefinite detention section of the law (1021) likely violates the First and Fifth Amendments of the U.S. Constitution and issued a preliminary injunction preventing the U.S. government from enforcing it. In September 2012, the Obama administration called on the federal appeals court to reverse the "dangerous" ruling of the lower court, supporting the plaintiffs in the lawsuit and arguing that the rule was so vague that it could be used against US citizens and journalists. On July 17, 2013, the U.S. Court of Appeals for the Second Circuit struck down the injunction against indefinite detention of U.S. citizens by the president under the National Defense Authorization Act of 2012. The appellate court ruled that "plaintiffs lack standing to seek pre-enforcement review of Section 1021 and vacate the permanent injunction ruling that the American citizen plaintiffs lack standing because Section 1021 says nothing at all about the President's authority to detain American citizens. The Supreme Court declined to hear an appeal of the case.

In 2013, the House of Representatives and the Senate reauthorized the National Defense Authorization Act after amendments to effectively ban indefinite detention of U.S. Citizens were defeated in both chambers. On December 26, 2013, President Obama signed into law the National Defense Authorization Act of 2014.

See also
Administrative detention
At His Majesty's pleasure, a legal term of art in Commonwealth countries which includes the indeterminate sentences of some convicted prisoners
Detention (imprisonment)
Habeas corpus
Indefinite imprisonment
Incapacitation (penology)

References

Imprisonment and detention